Dobot is a brand of robotic arms produced by Shenzhen Yuejiang Technology Co., Ltd. The company was founded in 2015 and is based in Shenzhen, China. That year, the first Dobot significantly exceeded its initial $36,000 Kickstarter funding goal, ultimately raising $650,000. The company has since released five models.

History
Shenzhen Yuejiang Technology Co., Ltd. was founded in June 2015 by Jerry Liu, who became its CEO, and six of his classmates in robotics engineering. The company is based in Shenzhen, China. Liu and his cofounders originally intended to build large-scale industrial arms, but realizing the competition in the field, he decided to begin with smaller models and then scale upward.
In October 2015 of that year, the company launched a Kickstarter campaign for a desktop robotic arm called Dobot. The campaign was successful, raising over $600,000 more than the initial goal of $36,000. The success of the Kickstarter campaign led to an additional $3 million of third-round funding for the startup in April 2016, making it one of the most valuable robotics startups in China.

By March 2017, the company had expanded to have 96 employees. That year, a calligraphy performance by the Dobot Magician was featured in the CCTV New Year's Gala broadcast, drawing further publicity.

Models
Dobot V1.0 debuted on Kickstarter in 2015. The arm is capable of precision household tasks.

In 2016, Shenzhen Yuejiang Technology released the Dobot Magician, which allows precision writing and laser engraving.

Dobot M1, which also premiered in 2016, features two toolheads, with the options of a gripper hand, a suction cup, a 3D printer, a 4th axis attachment, or a laser engraver. The M1 can be programmed by a manual learning mode or through coding and is intended primarily for industrial use by small businesses. Like its predecessors, the M1 began with a Kickstarter campaign, the first round of which sold out in under 10 minutes. In a review, Digital Trends described it as able to perform "an absolutely massive range of different tasks" similar to "Tony Stark’s JARVIS robot". In a dissenting review, Geekwire was skeptical of the price, saying that Dobot "is playing it fast and loose with the word 'affordable.'"

Dobot Rigiet is a three-axis stabilizer for cameras and smartphones, released in 2017. The Huffington Post included it in their "Ultimate Tech Gift Guide for the 2017 Holiday Season".

Dobot MOOZ is a 3D printer aimed at artists and educators. It can also do CNC carving and laser engraving. In the first month of its 2017 Kickstarter campaign, it raised over $100,000.

Dobot products include: Dobot Arm in Industry: Dobot CR, Dobot MG400 and Dobot M1 and Dobot Arm in Education: Dobot Magician

References

Technology companies of China
Robotics companies
Technology companies established in 2015
Kickstarter-funded products